Tower is a New Zealand-based insurance company which provides car, home, contents, business, boat, pet, travel and other general insurance.

History
In 1869 the New Zealand Government provided the capital for the creation of the New Zealand Government Life Insurance Department (better known simply as Government Life). It became Tower Corporation in 1987 at a time when several New Zealand government departments and organisations were being corporatized or converted into state owned enterprises. Three years later, ownership of Tower was transferred to policyholders as the business was mutualised.

Being a mutual caused difficulties in raising capital and nine years later, in 1999, Tower demutualised and listed on the Australian and New Zealand stock exchanges. Seven years later, in November 2006, TOWER's Australian and New Zealand operations were separated  with the approval of its shareholders and the high court. Today Tower is still shareholder owned and listed on the NZX.

Diversification from plain life insurance
In 1989, Tower bought the National Insurance Company of New Zealand Limited. Originally founding its Head Office in Dunedin in 1873, the National Insurance Company had now grown its operations throughout the world. National Insurance had bought the failed Standard Insurance Company Limited in 1961. These businesses provided Tower's fire and general insurance divisions. 

In 2012, Tower sold both its medical insurance (Tower Medical Insurance Limited) and its investment (Tower Managed Funds Limited) divisions. This was followed in 2013 with the sale of Tower's life insurance business. 

In line with many other New Zealand insurance companies, Tower announced on 10 April 2013 that it was moving away from full replacement house policies towards nominated sum insured covers, blaming international reinsurers. 

In August 2021, Tower also began offering boat insurance policies online.

Digital transformation 
In 2015, Tower announced an investment of $24 million to replace its IT systems through a five-year project to automate everyday tasks in a consistent and standard way. 

In 2019, Tower deployed a cloud-based digital insurance platform that replaced numerous legacy systems. This introduction grew Tower’s online sales from zero to 65 percent between 2019 and 2021. 

In December 2020, Tower released its mobile app, GoCarma. The app rewards motorists for driving safely and is available to all New Zealanders. Within a year of launching, the app recorded more than 10.5 million kilometres of driving. In December 2021, data from GoCarma revealed the towns with the best and worst drivers in New Zealand. 

In June 2021, Tower launched Quick Quote, a simple online quoting tool that automatically pulls publicly available sources and pre-populates information to cut down the number of questions asked for customers when sourcing an insurance quote. 

With Quick Quote, customers are asked five questions for car insurance, nine for house insurance and seven for contents insurance policies. 

In November 2021, Tower announced it would share flood risk ratings with all New Zealanders by using data to match flood premiums to risk more accurately. Customers’ properties would be categorised into a low, medium, high or very high-risk category and premiums priced accordingly.

Today
Today, Tower operates across New Zealand and the Pacific Islands, providing personal lines insurance and SME insurance for ~ 300k customers and has ~9.2% market share of NZ personal lines market. 

Tower’s 2022 half year results reported underlying profit excluding large events of $18.2 million. Tower’s gross written premiums (GWP) rose from $194.6m in the 2021 half year, to $216.1m while its net earned premiums rose from $167.8m to $173.7m. 

In August 2021, Tower moved its headquarters to a new six Green Star-rated building on Fanshawe Street. 

In November 2021, TOWER announced it is taking complete ownership of its subsidiary National Pacific Insurance Limited (NPI) to streamline its New Zealand and Pacific operations. 

Tower’s recent awards include 2022 Insurance Business New Zealand General Insurer of the year, 2021 Canstar Car Insurer of the Year & Canstar Outstanding Value Car Award. 

Tower released its new brand identity ‘Thinking Ahead’ in March 2022. The new branding matches Towers growth strategy and customer-centric approach. 

In May 2022, Tower announced they will acquire TSBs insurance portfolio for $5.2 million. Tower has been underwriting TSBs portfolio since 2004. This is in addition to Tower’s recent acquisitions of Club Marine, ANZs insurance business and a small Westpac legacy portfolio.

Industry partnerships 
Tower has a long history of partnering with other businesses, showing how the insurance industry can work with other industries to provide value to customers.   

In 2015, Tower partnered with Trade Me Group to offer online home, contents and car insurance. The partnership was renewed for a further five years in August 2021. 

In 2020, Tower partnered with the University of Auckland’s not-for-profit arm, UniServices, to analyse data on customer experience to improve insurance buying and claiming processes. 

In 2021, Tower partnered with Australia-headquartered insurtech firm, Open, to launch AI powered personalised insurance service Huddle in New Zealand. 

Also in 2021, Tower partnered with Allianz, one of the world’s leading travel insurance specialists, to deliver travel insurance and pet insurance products.  

Additionally, Tower partnered with the New Zealand Defence Force in 2021, providing tailored insurance policies, for current and former service men and women, and their families.

Government Life postage stamps
A unique (in New Zealand) feature of the Government Life office was its use of custom postage stamps, first issued in 1891. This was the result of a dispute between the office and the New Zealand Post and Telegraph Department over the correct calculation of postage costs. All issues featured lighthouses, either in abstract designs or specific lighthouses from around New Zealand. New designs were issued in 1905, 1947 (surcharged at the time of decimalisation in 1967), 1969, and 1981. Use of these stamps was finally withdrawn in 1989.

References

External links
 

Financial services companies established in 1869
Insurance companies of New Zealand
Companies based in Auckland
Companies listed on the New Zealand Exchange
2018 mergers and acquisitions